Rudi Edwin Bryson (born 25 July 1968) is a former South African cricketer who played seven One Day Internationals in 1997. He also played in 96 first-class and 155 List A matches during his career.

References

External links

1968 births
Living people
South African cricketers
South Africa One Day International cricketers
Easterns cricketers
Eastern Province cricketers
Northerns cricketers
Surrey cricketers
People from Springs, Gauteng